Atlantic High School may refer to:

In the United States 
 Atlantic Community High School, Delray Beach, Florida
 Atlantic High School (Florida), Port Orange, Florida
 Atlantic High School (Iowa), Atlantic, Iowa